Anbazhagan is an Indian surname. Notable people with the surname include:

J. Anbazhagan (1958–2020), Indian politician 
K. Anbazhagan (1922–2020), Indian politician
M. Anbazhagan (born 1987), Indian film director and screenwriter
T. Anbazhagan, Indian politician

Indian surnames